Johnny Hiland is a legally blind American musician/guitarist.

Early life
Hiland grew up in Maine, with an eye disease called nystagmus. He started playing guitar at age 2, played his first talent show at age 5, performed on Dick Stacey's Jamboree on local TV at age 7, and won Talent America at age 10, with sister Jodi and brother Jerry, "The 3 J's," playing bluegrass country. The 3 J's broke up when Johnny turned 15, due to his voice changing. Having picked up electric guitar at the age of 12, Johnny left bluegrass, and started playing country, rock, and blues.

Career
In 1996, Hiland moved to Nashville and worked as a session musician for country artists including Toby Keith, Ricky Skaggs, Janie Fricke, and Hank Williams III. Meanwhile, he played with the Don Kelley Band at Robert's Western World. Hiland signed with Steve Vai's Favored Nations label as a solo artist.

Discography
2002 "Lovesick, Broke and Driftin," Hank Williams III, Curb
2002 "Forgive," Jesus and Bartenders, Rebecca Lynn Howard MCA
2004 Johnny Hiland (Favored Nations)
2004 "The Bluegrass Sessions," Lynn Anderson,DM Nashville
2004 "The Bluegrass Sessions," Janie Fricke,DM Nashville
2004 "Passing Through," Angels, Randy Travis, Word Records
2005 "R.I.D.E.," Trick Pony, Curb
2005 "Honky Tonk University," She Left Me, Toby Keith, Dreamworks Records Nashville
2006 Straight to Hell (album), Hank Williams III, Curb
2007 "Brand New Strings," Brand New Strings, Ricky Skaggs, Skaggs Family Records,Inc
2007 Jennifer Brantley, Breakdown, Mountainside Productions
2008 Damn Right, Rebel Proud, Hank Williams III, Curb
2009 Loud And Proud (O.I.E. Records)
2010 "Rebel Within," Hank Williams III, Sidewalk Records Inc.
2011 All Fired Up (Shrapnel Records)
2011 Rebel Within Audio, Hank Williams III, Curb
2011 Ghost to a Ghost/Gutter Town, Hank Williams III, Megaforce Records
2013 "Brothers of the 4x4," Hank 3, Hank 3 Records
2013 Higher To Go – A tribute To Forrest Lee, Sr., Out West Records
2015 "80 and Pickin' with my Friends," Nokie Edwards

References

External links
Official website

American country guitarists
American male guitarists
American country songwriters
American male songwriters
American session musicians
Living people
Place of birth missing (living people)
Musicians from Nashville, Tennessee
Guitarists from Maine
Songwriters from Tennessee
Songwriters from Maine
1975 births
Guitarists from Tennessee
Country musicians from Tennessee
21st-century American guitarists
21st-century American male musicians
Favored Nations artists
Shrapnel Records artists
Provogue Records artists